Ramsgate Stadium was a greyhound racing stadium also known as Dumpton Park Stadium in Ramsgate.

Origins
The Greyhound Racing Association (Isle of Thanet) Ltd obtained a plot of land south of Dumpton in the Sir Moses Montefiore Ward and planned to open a greyhound track by 1928. It would be known as Dumpton Park named after the parkland to the north. Part of the Kent Coast Line had recently been replaced by a road called Dumpton Park Drive and the stadium was erected off this road between Muir Road to the south and Montefiore Avenue to the north.

The stadium would be accessed via the Hereson Road and the Tunnel Railway (also known as the Ramsgate Underground Railway) was built around the same time and the narrow gauge railway went directly under the stadium.

Opening
The track opened on Saturday 26 May 1928 and Mrs D Coleman's Southern Surprise (trained by Aden Frank Dandridge) won the first ever race at 3pm over 500 yards at odds of 4-1 in a time of 32.25 secs. The six race card attracted a good crowd with the other winners being trained by W Wyles, Archie Whitcher and R Sandy. Race two went to Merman owned by Mrs Lyne Dixson wife of Major Lyne Dixson, one of the founders of the Greyhound Racing Association (GRA).

The stadium track was described as a well laid out course, 430 yards in circumference with good long straights and easy turns. It had an 'Inside Sumner' hare system and amenities included the Thanet Racing Club, a glass fronted enclosure in the 4s, 6d ring. The kennel facilities were opposite the track adjoining the Dumpton Park railway station.

Pre war history
A second meeting was held on Monday 28 May before the schedule reverted to every Thursday and Saturday. The Director of Racing was Major Dixson and the Racing Manager was Ernest Ledger. Ledger would remain the Racing Manager for over thirty years.

The town of Ramsgate saw a second track built in 1936 known as Newington Greyhound Stadium; the track was situated on the west of Newington Road, just north of Bush Avenue but unlike Dumpton Park never raced under National Greyhound Racing Club rules.

After war was declared Ramsgate suffered major disruption with racing being suspended during 1940.

Post war history
Two trainers brought great success to the track, Jack Daley and Jack Sherry won regular competitions for Ramsgate. Good Worker (Daley) won the 1948 Laurels, Silver Salver, Champion Stakes and Wimbledon Produce Stakes. Blossom of Annagura (Sherry) achieved a notable double winning successive Grand National in 1949 and 1950.

In the 1960s the track policy was to close during the winter months of January and February. The principal event was the Cavalier Cup and ownership of the track was in the hands of the Ramsgate Dumpton Thanet Greyhounds Ltd. J J Foster became Racing Manager from the long serving Ledger and the attached trainers were Sherry, W McKenna, T Cracknell & Jim Barry.

In 1975 trainer Peter Rich former head man to John Coleman won all eight races in one meeting producing a 428,793-1 accumulator.

Northern Sports
A huge turning point for the track materialised in 1976, the stadium had been struggling to attract large crowds due to an ageing stadium and poor facilities but a company called Northern Sports (parent company Hawkins of Harrow) led by former Oaks winning trainer Mick Hawkins and his son David (the Managing Director) purchased the stadium from Dumpton (Thanet) Greyhounds Ltd for £185,000. Mick was also the owner of the independent track Doncaster Greyhound Track.

One year later Jeff Jefcoate left the GRA to join Ramsgate as Racing Manager, J J Foster became Director of Racing and a new race was introduced called the Thanet Gold Cup. Plans were subsequently submitted to the local council for permission to build for a new one million pound grandstand.

Northern Sports purchased Oxford Stadium and Long Eaton Stadium in 1978 and the grandstand was finally completed in 1984. The state of the art facility featured a 200-seater tiered restaurant which became a model for the industry soon afterwards. A sports centre was built within the stadium and included squash, snooker clubs and a gymnasium. Oxford followed suit two years later. Northern Sports and David Hawkins gained many accolades within the industry and both Ramsgate and Oxford profited.

Scurlogue Champ broke the track record in 1985 and the track made two English Greyhound Derby finals with Carrigeen Chimes (Gary Baggs) in 1985 and Sunley Express (Peter Rich) in 1986. Two other Ramsgate trainers Stan Kennett and Ron Luton also had success but Baggs moved to join Oxford in 1986 before diverting to Walthamstow Stadium.

Ramsgate were awarded a lucrative Bookmakers Afternoon Greyhound Service (BAGS) contract after the success of sister track Oxford. Mick Wheble was given the role of BAGS co-ordinator overseeing new Racing Manager Stuart Netting.

The tracks forecourt car park featured as a market set for the BBC's Only Fools and Horses 1989 episode The Jolly Boys Outing.

Closure
As the 1990s progressed Northern Sports parent company Hawkins of Harrow were beginning to suffer from the recession that was affecting their other business interests in construction and garden centres. In 1995 Hawkins of Harrow called in the receivers and Oxford was made a going concern but Ramsgate was sold for redevelopment. Dumpton Park closed its doors in March 1996.

The popular seaside stadium known as the Garden Track of England closed its doors in May 1996.
The site today is the Brindle Grove housing.

Competitions

Thanet Gold Cup
The Thanet Gold Cup was held over 450 metres.

Kent St Leger

Track records
Pre-metric

Post-metric

References

Defunct greyhound racing venues in the United Kingdom
Sports venues completed in 1929
1929 establishments in England
Sport in Kent
Defunct sports venues in Kent